

Mikhail Mordkin (December 9, 1880, Moscow, Russian Empire - July 15, 1944, New York) graduated from the Bolshoi Ballet School in 1899, and in the same year was appointed ballet master.

He joined Diaghilev's ballet in 1909 as a leading dancer. After the first season he remained in Paris to dance with Anna Pavlova. He then formed his own company, the All Star Imperial Russian Ballet, which toured America in 1911 and 1912.

Mikhail returned to the Bolshoi and was appointed its director in 1917. He left Russia after the October Revolution, first working in Lithuania, and finally settling in the United States in 1924. He founded the Mordkin Ballet in 1926, for which he choreographed a complete Swan Lake and many other ballets. His company included such distinguished artists as Hilda Butsova, Felia Doubrovska, Pierre Vladimiroff, Vera Nemtchinova and Nicholas Zvereff. After a European tour the company disbanded in 1926.

Mordkin continued to be a freelance artist and teacher, including at the Cornish School in the 1920s. From among his students in America he formed a new Mordkin Ballet in 1937. Although he had been pushed into the background, Mordkin helped build the foundation for ballet in America.

Mikhail Mordkin died in Millbrook, New York.

Cultural depictions 
 Anna Pavlova, film by Emil Loteanu; portrayed by Grigore Grigoriu (1983).

See also

 List of Russian ballet dancers

References

External links
 Mikhail Mordkin papers, circa 1885-1979, Jerome Robbins Dance Division, New York Public Library for the Performing Arts

Male ballet dancers from the Russian Empire
Ballets Russes dancers
1880 births
1944 deaths
Ballet teachers
American Ballet Theatre
White Russian emigrants to the United States
Moscow State Academy of Choreography alumni